Pempeliella matilella is a species of snout moth. It is found on Sardinia and Corsica.

References

Moths described in 2001
Phycitini
Moths of Europe